Black Warrior may refer to:
 Black Warrior (wrestler), a professional wrestler (luchador)
 Xuanwu (god), a Taoist god whose name is sometimes translated as the "Black Warrior"
 Black Tortoise, a Chinese constellation also known as the Black Warrior of the North
 Tuskaloosa, a paramount chief whose name is often translated as "Black Warrior"
 Black Warrior River, a river in Alabama named for Tuskaloosa
 Black Warrior Basin, a geological feature in Alabama and Mississippi
 CSS Black Warrior, a ship named for Tuskaloosa
 The Black Warrior Affair between Spain and the United States, named for a ship named for Tuskaloosa
 Black Warrior Review, a literary magazine in Tuscaloosa, Alabama

See also
Guerrero Negro, the largest town in the municipality of Mulegé in the Mexican state of Baja California Sur, whose name translates as "Black Warrior"